"The Metamorph" is the first episode of the second series of Space: 1999 (and the twenty-fifth overall episode of the programme).  The screenplay was written by Johnny Byrne; the director was Charles Crichton.  Previous titles were "The Biological Soul" and "The Biological Computer".  The final shooting script is dated 19 January 1976.  Live-action filming took place Monday 26 January 1976 through Monday 16 February 1976.

Story

It is 342 days after leaving Earth orbit, and Moonbase Alpha is recovering after a recent encounter with a space warp.  Without warning, the Moon was flung six light-years across space.  Though there were no casualties, one life-support system was critically damaged.  A quantity of titanium is required to complete repairs.  Commander John Koenig dispatches a survey Eagle to reconnoitre a nearby solar system for the rare mineral.  From the new, underground Command Centre, the staff tracks Eagle One as it approaches a near-habitable planet.  Though the atmosphere is breathable, the barren surface is covered with active volcanoes and temperatures average 180° Fahrenheit.

Computer analysis reveals large deposits of titanium, and Astronauts Bill Fraser and Ray Torens are recalled.  Unseen by the pilots, a boulder inexplicably changes into a large sphere of green energy—which then follows Eagle One.  Moonbase sensors detect the mysterious pursuer and Koenig warns Fraser.  Despite rigorous evasive manoeuvres, the sphere effortlessly follows the ship.  Among the Command Centre staff is Fraser's wife of two months, Annette.  She faints as the ball of light engulfs her husband's Eagle and drags it down to the planet.

Following the abduction, Alpha goes to alert status.  Tony Verdeschi, head of Security and recently appointed second-in-command, mobilises the defences—which now include large-scale laser batteries.  Koenig insists there must be intelligent life on the planet.  Scientific officer Lew Picard declares no life as they know it could exist in that environment.  Just then, a middle-aged alien man appears on the big screen, introducing himself as Mentor of the planet Psychon.  Koenig immediately accuses the being of attacking an unarmed survey ship—which, Mentor counters, was trespassing on his planet.

After a lengthy exchange, an understanding is reached.  Mentor agrees to release the pilots.  Their vessel is damaged, however; another Eagle must be sent to collect them.  In the interests of peace, the alien will also give them the titanium, asking that a science specialist be sent to discuss the details.  Mentor also asks for them to bring a physician, as one of the astronauts was injured.  Koenig, suspicious of the alien's generosity, agrees to a rendezvous in space.  He orders the excursion Eagle fitted with two booster units—in case there is reason to hurry home.

In a subterranean complex on Psychon, Mentor turns to his companion—a lioness lying across a console—and asks her opinion.  The animal transforms into an exotically beautiful young woman:  his daughter Maya.  The girl is a metamorph, trained by her father in the Psychon art of molecular transformation, able to assume the form of any living organism at will.  Well disposed toward the Alphans, she finds them more attractive and agreeable than past alien visitors.  When she playfully metamorphoses into Koenig, Mentor scolds her for frivolously misusing her abilities.  With work to be done, he shoos her out of the Grove.

Eagle Four lifts off, crewed by Koenig, Picard, Helena Russell and Alan Carter.  As they arrive at Psychon, an alien craft approaches.  Sensors reveal the silent ship is under remote control, is radiating magnetic energy—and contains no life-forms.  (Unknown to them, it was created out of rock by Mentor's power of matter transmutation.)  Acting like an electromagnet, it drags the Eagle downward.  When full engine thrust fails to break the alien's grip, Koenig orders the booster rockets fired.  To Mentor's chagrin, Eagle Four blasts free.  He converts the vessel into an energy sphere to capture Koenig.  Eagle Four comes to rest in a volcanic crater, surrounded by derelict alien vessels.

Mentor contacts Koenig, ignoring the Commander's protests as he welcomes the humans to Psychon.  Behind him, the Alphan astronauts are marched into the Grove.  Seeing Koenig's image on the screen, Fraser tries to warn him of something, but is stunned by a guard.  Mentor tries to pass off his outburst as delirium, then tells Koenig to stay put until contacted again.  As Fraser is taken away, Mentor turns to Torens, who is strapped in a seat behind a glass partition.  A futuristic skull-fitting dome descends over the pilot's head.  The alien scientist touches a panel and Torens arches in agony, mouth opening in a silent scream.

Distrustful of their 'host', the Koenig and party disembark into the spaceship graveyard.  They enter a tunnel, following it underground.  Picard spies titanium ore among the loose gravel littering the ground; Helena pockets the nuggets to take back to Alpha.  Rounding a bend, the four enter a large cavern inhabited by a diverse collection of aliens.  Guarded by Mentor's Overseers, they are engaged in mining activities.  From their mindless behaviour, Helena recognises the aliens are suffering from a form of brain damage.  They are shocked to discover one of the zombie-like miners is Torens.

Reaching out to him, Koenig is repelled by force-field.  An Overseer is attracted by the commotion; when shot with a stun-blast, the being changes into a stone slab.  Picard speculates the guard was created from inert matter by molecular transformation.  As they proceed, an image of Mentor blocks the tunnel.  The alien warns them the hologram is surrounded by an impenetrable force-field.  Hoping to overpower the barrier, Picard fires his laser rifle—but the beam ricochets back to atomise the Frenchman.  When their stun-guns transformed into molten rocks, Koenig and company retreat, but are captured by another sphere of light.

Koenig regains consciousness alone in a cell, startled by the lioness guarding the open doorway.  When he backs away from the beast, Maya reverts to her normal form.  As she and her father are the sole inhabitants of Psychon, the girl is eager to interact with the alien commander.  Koenig then tries to exit the cell and encounters another force-field.  Though Maya's apology is earnest, Koenig is enraged by what he feels is another Psychon trick.  Maya is shocked when Koenig attacks Mentor's character by citing a list of his malicious deeds.  Ignorant of her father's activities, she does not believe Koenig, thinking he is still disoriented.

At the Grove, Mentor admits Koenig, but prevents a curious Maya from joining them.  The room is dominated by a surreal artefact: a hexagonal dais from which dozens of glass conduits rise to penetrate the rocky ceiling.  The conduits contain bubbling organic fluids of every colour, and the object hums and pulses with energy.  With affection, Mentor introduces it as Psyche, a biological computer.  Using its ability to manipulate matter, he plans to transform this dying world from a volcanic wasteland back to its former splendour.

The alien scientist makes a gruesome revelation:  Psyche derives its energy from the minds of intelligent beings.  Like Torens, the brain-dead slaves in the pits have all been in 'rapport' with the machine.  Koenig is appalled as the madman states the arrival of the Moon and its 297 human inhabitants should provide enough energy to make his world live again.  When Koenig refuses to hand over the Alpha people, Mentor demonstrates his power by detonating a lunar mountain close to Moonbase.

Koenig refuses to yield, preferring the Alphans be mercifully destroyed than condemned to this obscenity.  The wily Mentor then reveals Koenig's missing comrades—strapped down in the brain transfer unit.  Unless Koenig submits, their minds will be given to Psyche.  Koenig stands firm, and the process begins.  As his people writhe in agony under the glass domes, Mentor taunts Koenig with how little time remains to them.  Apparently unable to stand by and watch Helena suffer, Koenig surrenders.

On Moonbase Alpha, the mood is sombre.  There has been no contact with either Eagle crew and Mentor's complex is shielded against their scanners.  The staff is excited when they receive a signal from Koenig—more so when he announces the Alphans have been given permission to settle on Psychon.  When Verdeschi questions the abruptness of events, the Commander sternly informs him the operation is covered under 'directive four' and will commence at once.  Shocked that Koenig would betray the entire population of Alpha, Helena demands an explanation.  As the group are led to a cell, the Commander justifies his actions in the name of self-preservation.

On Alpha, a brooding Verdeschi paces, while the staff wonders why the evacuation has not commenced.  Sandra Benes consults Computer for the meaning of the unfamiliar 'directive four'; Computer denies her access due to insufficient security clearance.  Asking Verdeschi in private, she is told it is a code signal between Koenig and himself—an irrevocable order to destroy the place from which it is issued.  To her horror, the security chief contacts the Weapons Section and orders a remote-controlled Eagle equipped with a maximum load of nuclear ordnance.

Having overheard, Annette demands an explanation.  Verdeschi tries to convey the severity of the situation, but the hysterical Annette, thinking only of her husband, refuses to listen.  Holding the sobbing woman, Verdeschi orders the ship launched.  On Psychon, Mentor and his daughter observe the lone Eagle approaching.  The scientist scans the vessel, angered when its deadly cargo is revealed.  Indignant, Maya leaves to confront the Alphans.  Mentor contacts the prisoners, berating Koenig for trying to deceive him with a kamikaze Eagle.  Having shunned Koenig, Helena and the others now realise the Commander's 'traitorous' actions were a ruse.

Mentor vows to first destroy the Eagle—then the Moon.  After he signs off, an angry Maya arrives to tell Koenig what she thinks of him.  She is appalled when he reveals Mentor's horrific agenda—especially the fate of those unfortunate to enter into 'rapport' with Psyche.  She calls him a liar, but Koenig verbally batters her, demanding she go to the pits and see for herself.  The alien girl flees...but finds herself running to the entrance to the tunnels.  Koenig's tirade has exposed her inner doubts regarding Mentor's often secretive and condescending manner.  Bracing herself, she transforms into a bird and flies on.

Maya soon encounters the mindless slave workers.  She is numbed by the discovery, all faith in her father destroyed.  During this, Mentor destroys the remote-controlled Eagle, then turns his wrath on Alpha.  Via holographic projection, Koenig and company watch as explosions rip through the complex.  A distraught Maya returns to the cell in time to hear her father gloat how he will destroy Moonbase piece by piece.  Koenig implores her to release them and help prevent the senseless slaughter of three hundred more people.  After Koenig promises to stop Mentor without harming him, she lowers the force-field.  As the others make for the Eagle, Maya leads Koenig to the Grove.

Koenig acts fast, bashing Psyche's controls with a stalactite ripped from the ceiling.  Mentor grabs him, shouting that the sudden release of Pyche's energy could destroy the planet; Koenig throws off the older man and continues his vandalism.  Soon, the floor begins to heave and fracture, flames bursting through the cracks.  Psyche's 'death' is apocalyptic:  all across Psychon volcanoes begin erupting in a chain reaction.   As the fire spreads, a wounded Mentor implores Maya to stop Koenig.  Sobbing, the girl does not move, revealing her newfound knowledge of his horrible deeds.

In the caves, Helena and Fraser try to retrieve Torens, but the pilot is buried alive when the ceiling collapses on the unfortunate miners.  In the Grove, Mentor is trapped behind a wall of flame.  Utterly defeated, he begs for his daughter's understanding.  Watching the Grove crumble around them, he shouts for Maya to save herself.  She refuses to abandon him.  Koenig restrains her as she desperately transforms from one animal to another, trying to break free.  He drags Maya out of the Grove as Mentor is consumed by the inferno.  Running for their lives, they navigate the quaking tunnels leading to Eagle Four.

They board and the ship takes off—just as the volcanic crater erupts beneath it.  Carter fights for control as the growing tectonic stresses blow the planet apart.  Eagle Four makes contact with Moonbase, and the Frasers enjoy a sweet reunion over the TV monitor.  During this, Koenig and Helena comfort Maya.  The girl is inconsolable, devastated by the loss of her entire existence.  They invite her to make a new life for herself on Alpha.  Maya believes anywhere but on Psychon she will be an alien.  Koenig replies, 'We're all aliens...until we get to know one another.'

Cast

Starring
 Martin Landau — Commander John Koenig
 Barbara Bain — Doctor Helena Russell

Also Starring
 Catherine Schell — Maya

Featuring
 Tony Anholt — Tony Verdeschi
 Nick Tate — Captain Alan Carter
 Zienia Merton — Sandra Benes

Guest Stars
 Brian Blessed — Mentor
 Anoushka Hempel — Annette Fraser

Also Featuring
 John Hug — Astronaut Bill Fraser
 Gerard Paquis — Lew Picard
 Peter Porteous — Petrov
 Nick Brimble — Astronaut Ray Torens
 Anton Phillips — Doctor Bob Mathias

Uncredited Artists
 Robert Reeves — Peter
 Sarah Bullen — Kate
 George Lane Cooper — First Overseer
 Alf Joint — Second Overseer
 Reuben Martin — Maya/Gorilla
 Roy Stewart - Alien Miner
 Jenny Cresswell — Alpha Information Girl

Music 

An original score was composed for this episode by Derek Wadsworth.  Wadsworth, a jazz trombonist and composer, had been engaged to compose the score for the Gerry Anderson live-action television special The Day After Tomorrow.  (Also known as Into Infinity, it was intended as a back door pilot episode for a new science-fiction series.)  As Wadsworth's modern style, with its strong beat, would complement the new Space: 1999'''s action-adventure format, he was chosen as the composer for the second series.

Production Notes

 In October 1975, in the midst of pre-production on its second series, Sir Lew Grade informed executive producer Gerry Anderson that Space: 1999 would be cancelled unless extensive changes in form and content were made.  Anderson and new producer Fred Freiberger brainstormed, proposing a drastic retooling to broaden its appeal to the American audience (and hopefully win an American network sale).  The show would become more action-oriented and present a dynamic new cast of younger regulars joining Martin Landau and Barbara Bain.  At the forefront would be an alien girl whose power of 'molecular transformation' would give the show a science-fiction 'wow factor'.   Based on the format change, Abe Mandell, Grade's number two in New York, 'green-lit' the second series.
 As a result of the cancellation crisis, production resumed behind schedule.  Johnny Byrne's script "The Biological Soul" (which Byrne had already written to be the second-series premiere episode) was quickly pressed into service.  It told of the Alphans' encounter with the unbalanced Mentor of the planet Psycho and his biological computer, Psyche.  In this version, the solitary Mentor and the sentient Psyche share an affection for one another.  When Psyche becomes aware of her master's nefarious deeds and the suffering she has caused, she elects to destroy them both.  Written in the first-series format, it was extensively revised to reflect the many changes made in the interim.
 Freiberger had judged the first-series' supporting cast to be 'unlikeable'; considered expendable, he made no attempt to explain their absence.  The new characters were originally named Simon Hays (second-in-command), Mark Macinlock (head of Reconnaissance) and Jameson (head of Weapons Section).  Nick Tate was asked to return as Alan Carter only after Freiberger learned of the actor's popularity.  The revised script contained a conversation between Verdeschi and Sandra wherein Victor Bergman's fate was mentioned.  The professor's death was attributed to a spacesuit with a faulty helmet.  Though filmed, this sequence was not included in the final cut.
 Under Mentor's make-up, viewers will recognise Brian Blessed, famous for his sonorous voice and 'hearty, king-sized portrayals'; Blessed had appeared in the first-series episode "Death's Other Dominion" as Doctor Cabot Rowland.  Before joining the programme as Maya, Catherine Schell had also guest-starred in the previous series, portraying an android temptress, the Servant of the Guardian, in "Guardian of Piri".  Tony Anholt had starred as Paul Buchet in The Protectors, another Anderson production, before assuming the role of Tony Verdeschi.
 The date of Helena's status report—342 days after leaving orbit—contradicts previous information.  In "Dragon's Domain", the date was established as 877 days after leaving orbit.  Many attribute this continuity breach to Freiberger as, purportedly, the producer had screened only eight first-series episodes after joining the production.  The final shooting script listed the date as 108 days; this was changed in post production.  It also stated the mineral the Alphans required was '' (a fictional material), not titanium.  The term  would be used in the subsequent episode "Catacombs of the Moon", also as a rare and vital mineral essential to the life-support system.

 Novelisation 

The episode was adapted in the first Year Two Space: 1999 novel Planets of Peril by Michael Butterworth, published in 1977.  It contains the original character names of Hays, Macinlock and Jameson.  The script's multiple revisions may have confused the author:  Tony Verdeschi is left in command of Alpha while Simon Hays accompanies Koenig to Psychon.  The dialogue detailing Bergman's fate is included.

In the 2003 novel The Forsaken'' written by John Kenneth Muir, it is stated the events of this story were one of the consequences of the death of the eponymous intelligence depicted in "Space Brain".  The Brain controlled the space warps within its influence; after its death, they would become unpredictable and unstable.  This would allow the Moon to be flung within range of Psychon immediately before the episode.

References

External links 
Space: 1999 - "The Metamorph" - The Catacombs episode guide
Space: 1999 - "The Metamorph" - Moonbase Alpha's Space 1999 page

1976 British television episodes
Space: 1999 episodes